Soap Opera Update was a magazine dedicated to the coverage of soap operas, co-founded by Angela Shapiro in 1988. The magazine was published every three weeks. It was purchased by Bauer Media Group in 1992. The magazine became popular on newsstands in the mid-1990s. However, due to a lack of subscriptions and promotion, and criticisms for mediocre content and "lazy" press coverage, the magazine was discontinued in late 2002. In 2006, the Update began issuing Soaps In Depth and releasing an annual issue to review the soaps of the past year and preview soaps for the new year.

This magazine also produced the Soap Opera Update Awards, similar to the Soap Opera Digest Awards.

See also
 Soap Opera Digest
 Soap Opera Magazine
 Soap Opera Weekly
 Soaps In Depth

References

Bauer Media Group
Defunct magazines published in the United States
Magazines about soap operas
Magazines established in 1988
Magazines disestablished in 2002
Visual arts magazines published in the United States